Ackre Lake is located in the White Mountains southwest of Alpine, Arizona, off State Route 191. This lake is located in and administered by the Apache-Sitgreaves National Forests. The lake is stocked with trout and grayling.  Tiger salamanders are also found in Ackre Lake.

Fish species
 Apache trout
 Arctic Grayling

References

https://www.fws.gov/southwest/federal_assistance/PDFs/Chapter%208%20Salt%20River%20Watershed.pdf

External links
Arizona Boating Locations Facilities Map
Arizona Fishing Locations Map
Arizona Fishing Ackre Lake HookedAZ.com community

White Mountains (Arizona)
Lakes of Arizona
Lakes of Greenlee County, Arizona
Tourist attractions in Greenlee County, Arizona
Apache-Sitgreaves National Forests